Asafoetida  (also spelled asafetida)
They are part of the celery family, Umbelliferae. Asafoetida is thought to be in the same genus as silphium, a North African plant now believed to be extinct, and was used as a cheaper substitute for that historically important herb from classical antiquity. The species are native to the deserts of Iran and mountains of Afghanistan where substantial amounts are grown.

Asafoetida has a pungent smell, as reflected in its name, lending it the trivial name of "stinking gum". The odor dissipates upon cooking; in cooked dishes, it delivers a smooth flavour reminiscent of leeks or other onion relatives. Asafoetida is also known colloquially as "devil's dung" in English (and similar expressions in many other languages).

Etymology and other names
The English name is derived from asa, a latinised form of Persian  'mastic', and Latin   'stinky'.

Other names include,  with its pungent odour having resulted in many unpleasant names:

Composition
Typical asafoetida contains about 40–64% resin, 25% endogeneous gum, 10–17% volatile oil, and 1.5–10% ash. The resin portion is known to contain asaresinotannols A and B, ferulic acid, umbelliferone and four unidentified compounds. The volatile oil component is rich in various organosulfide compounds, such as 2-butyl-propenyl-disulfide, diallyl sulfide, diallyl disulfide (also present in garlic)  and dimethyl trisulfide, which is also responsible for the odor of cooked onions. The organosulfides are primarily responsible for the odor and flavor of asafoetida.

Botanical sources 
Many Ferula species are utilized as the sources of asafoetida. Most of them are characterized by abundant sulfur-containing compounds in the essential oil.
Ferula foetida is the source of asafoetida in Eastern Iran, western Afghanistan, western Pakistan and Central Asia (Karakum Desert, Kyzylkum Desert). It is one of the most widely distributed asafoetida-producing species and often mistaken for F. assa-foetida. It has sulfur-containing compounds in the essential oil.
Ferula assa-foetida is endemic to Southern Iran and is the source of asafoetida there. It has sulfur-containing compounds in the essential oil. Although it is often considered the main source of asafoetida on the international market, this notion is attributable to the fact that several Ferula species acting as the major sources are often misidentified as F. assa-foetida. In fact, the production of asafoetida from F. assa-foetida is confined to its native range, namely Southern Iran, outside which the sources of asafoetida are other species.
Ferula pseudalliacea and Ferula rubricaulis endemic to western and southwestern Iran are sometimes considered conspecific with F. assa-foetida.
Ferula lutensis is the source of asafoetida in Eastern Iran. It has sulfur-containing compounds in the essential oil.
Ferula alliacea is the source of asafoetida in Eastern Iran. It has sulfur-containing compounds in the essential oil.
Ferula latisecta is the source of asafoetida in Eastern Iran and southern Turkmenistan. It has sulfur-containing compounds in the essential oil.
Ferula sinkiangensis is endemic to Xinjiang, China. It is the source of asafoetida in China. It has sulfur-containing compounds in the essential oil.
Ferula fukanensis is endemic to Xinjiang, China. It is the source of asafoetida in China. It has sulfur-containing compounds in the essential oil.
Ferula narthex is native to Afghanistan, northern Pakistan and Kashmir. Although it is often listed as the source of asafoetida, one report stated that it lacked sulfur-containing compounds in the essential oil.

Uses

Cooking

This spice is used as a digestive aid, in food as a condiment, and in pickling. It plays a critical flavoring role in South Asian vegetarian cuisine by acting as a savory enhancer. Used along with turmeric, it is a standard component of lentil curries, such as dal, chickpea curries, and vegetable dishes, especially those based on potato and cauliflower. Asafoetida is used in vegetarian Indian cuisine where it enhances the flavor of numerous dishes, where it is quickly heated in hot oil before sprinkling on the food. Kashmiri cuisine also uses it in lamb/mutton dishes such as rogan josh. It is sometimes used to harmonise sweet, sour, salty, and spicy components in food. The spice is added to the food at the time of tempering. Sometimes dried and ground asafoetida (in small quantities) can be mixed with salt and eaten with raw salad.

In its pure form, it is sold in the form of chunks of resin, small quantities of which are scraped off for use. The odor of the pure resin is so strong that the pungent smell will contaminate other spices stored nearby if it is not stored in an airtight container.

Cultivation and manufacture

The resin-like gum comes from the dried sap extracted from the stem and roots, and is used as a spice. The resin is greyish-white when fresh, but dries to a dark amber colour. The asafoetida resin is difficult to grate and is traditionally crushed between stones or with a hammer. Today, the most commonly available form is compounded asafoetida, a fine powder containing 30% asafoetida resin, along with rice flour or maida (white wheat flour) and gum arabic.

Ferula assa-foetida is a monoecious, herbaceous, perennial plant of the family Apiaceae. Stem leaves have wide sheathing petioles. Flowers are pale greenish yellow produced in large compound umbels. Fruits are oval, flat, thin, reddish brown and have a milky juice. Roots are thick, massive, and pulpy. They yield a resin similar to that of the stems. All parts of the plant have the distinctive fetid smell.

History
Asafoetida was familiar in the early Mediterranean, having come by land across Iran. It was brought to Europe by an expedition of Alexander the Great, who, after returning from a trip to northeastern ancient Persia, thought they had found a plant almost identical to the famed silphium of Cyrene in North Africa—though less tasty. Dioscorides, in the first century, wrote, "the Cyrenaic kind, even if one just tastes it, at once arouses a humour throughout the body and has a very healthy aroma, so that it is not noticed on the breath, or only a little; but the Median [Iranian] is weaker in power and has a nastier smell." Nevertheless, it could be substituted for silphium in cooking, which was fortunate, because a few decades after Dioscorides' time, the true silphium of Cyrene became extinct, and asafoetida became more popular amongst physicians, as well as cooks.

Asafoetida is also mentioned numerous times in Jewish literature, such as the Mishnah. Maimonides also writes in the Mishneh Torah "In the rainy season, one should eat warm food with much spice, but a limited amount of mustard and asafoetida [ ]."

While it is generally forgotten now in Europe, it is widely used in India. Asafoetida is mentioned in the Bhagavata Purana (7:5:23-24), which states that one must not have eaten hing before worshipping the deity. Asafoetida is eaten by Brahmins and Jains. Devotees of the Hare Krishna also use hing in their food, as they are not allowed to consume onions or garlic. Their food has to be presented to Lord Krishna for sanctification (to become Prasadam) before consumption and onions and garlic cannot be offered to Krishna.

Asafoetida was described by a number of Arab and Islamic scientists and pharmacists. Avicenna discussed the effects of asafoetida on digestion. Ibn al-Baitar and Fakhr al-Din al-Razi described some positive medicinal effects on the respiratory system.

After the fall of Rome and until the 16th century, asafoetida was rare in Europe, and if ever encountered, it was viewed as a medicine. "If used in cookery, it would ruin every dish because of its dreadful smell", asserted Garcia de Orta's European guest. "Nonsense", Garcia replied, "nothing is more widely used in every part of India, both in medicine and in cookery." During the Italian Renaissance, asafoetida was used as part of the exorcism ritual.

See also
 Ammoniacum
 Chaat masala
 Durian, a fruit with a pungent odor many find disagreeable
 Muskroot
 South Asian pickle
 Turmeric

References

External links

Gernot Katzer's Spice Pages, Botany, etymology, uses—detailed
Sally's Place, Additional information from Ammini Ramachandran
Saudi Aramco World article on the history of asafoetida

Introduction and Traditional Medicinal use of Asafoetida

Antiflatulents
Edible Apiaceae
Ferula
Indian spices
Medicinal plants of Asia
Resins
Spices